Christina on the Coast is an American home renovation television series featuring Christina Hall, centered around properties in Southern California. In June 2018, HGTV announced that Hall would be receiving her own Flip or Flop spin-off series. The series premiere focused on Hall renovating her new home following her divorce; with the remaining seven episodes focusing on her fixing up other people's homes. Filming began in fall 2018, for a spring 2019 premiere. On February 13, 2019, it was announced that the series would premiere on May 23, 2019.

On November 26, 2019, it was announced that the second season would launch on January 2, 2020. Some episodes of Season 2 were delayed to 2021.

On July 17, 2020, it was announced that the third season would begin in Spring 2021. The series ended December 29, 2022, after 38 episodes.

Episodes

Season 1 (2019)

Season 2 (2020)

Season 3 (2021)

References

Flip or Flop (franchise)
2019 American television series debuts
2010s American reality television series
Television shows set in Orange County, California
American television spin-offs
Reality television spin-offs
HGTV original programming